Sinotubulites is a genus of small, tube-shaped shelly fossils from the Ediacaran period. It is often found in association with Cloudina.

Its tube has a "tube-in-tube" structure composed of several thin layers. It bears prominent longitudinal sculptures and / or irregular rings, which were formed by the wrinkles of tube layers, and weaken gradually towards the inner layers.

The organism probably had a sessile life-style, lying on the sea floor.

Sinotubulites and Cloudina (discovered in 1972) are currently the two earliest known fossils of organisms that mineralized shells when alive, and are often found in the same fossil beds. It is remarkable that Cloudina specimens often have tiny holes bored in them, which are attributed to predators, while no such borings have been found in Sinotubulites. This suggests that Sinotubulites had evolved features that made it a much less attractive target than Cloudina. As a result, both organisms are important in analyses of the Cambrian explosion, as predation and the appearance of mineralised components are often cited as possible causes of the "explosion".

See also
 Corumbella
 Saarina
 Somatohelix
 List of Ediacaran genera

References

Prehistoric marine animals
Ediacaran life
Fossils of China
Fossils of Mexico
Enigmatic prehistoric animal genera